Joslin is an unincorporated community in Rock Island County, Illinois, United States and is located on Illinois Route 92 near Interstate 88.

Tyson operates a beef slaughter plant in Joslin.

Demographics

History
The Joslin Fairgrounds were the original site of the Rock Island County Fair, from the first fair in 1892 until the late 1920s.

References

Unincorporated communities in Rock Island County, Illinois
Unincorporated communities in Illinois